Harada is the 52nd most common Japanese surname. Notable personalities with this surname include:

, Japanese actor
, Japanese professional wrestler
, Japanese Zen Buddhist monk
, Japanese swimmer
, Japanese rock climber
, Japanese anime producer
, Japanese World War II flying ace
, Japanese game producer
, Japanese equestrian
, Japanese mathematician
, Japanese novelist
, Japanese boxing champion
, Japanese ski jumper
, Japanese footballer
, Japanese footballer
, Japanese comedian and actor
Takashi Harada, associated with the Harada Method of management development
, Japanese tennis player
, Japanese pastor, former president of Doshisha University
, Japanese motorcyclist
, Japanese novelist
, Japanese politician of the Liberal Democratic Party

See also
Toyo Harada, fictional comic book superhero appearing in books published by the American publisher Valiant Comics
6399 Harada, a minor planet

References

Japanese-language surnames